Kebapetse Gaseitsiwe (born 14 November 1966) is a Botswana sprinter. He competed in the men's 4 × 400 metres relay at the 1988 Summer Olympics.

References

External links
 

1966 births
Living people
Athletes (track and field) at the 1988 Summer Olympics
Athletes (track and field) at the 1992 Summer Olympics
Botswana male sprinters
Botswana male middle-distance runners
Olympic athletes of Botswana
Place of birth missing (living people)